Lunenburg, Nova Scotia can mean:

Lunenburg, Nova Scotia (town)
Lunenburg, Nova Scotia (municipal district)
Lunenburg County, Nova Scotia